Jamsher Khas is a village in Jalandhar district of Punjab State, India. The village is administrated by a sarpanch who is an elected representative of village as per Panchayati raj (India).

Transport 
Jamsher  Khas is well connected by various roads to the surrounding village, towns. Major District Road 82 (MDR 82) of Punjab is the main highway passing through the village that connects Jalandhar to Talwan via Jamsher Khas , Jandiala and Nurmahal.  The major North-South Grand Trunk Road is only 8;km away from village of Jamsher.

Bus and Taxi 
A lot of mini, private and state transport buses are available from ISBT Jalandhar to Jamsher khas on Jandiala-Nurmahal-Talwan Route. Other Interstate and State buses can be caught from Jalandhar interstate bus terminal. For a personal service, a minivan taxi or three wheeler service can be hired from the Jalandhar city.

Rail 
Jamsher Khas  train station lies on Jalandhar-Nakodar Stretch of Northern Railway zone. For further connections to longer distance services including to the union capital, Delhi, one can travel either to Jalandhar Cantt. or Jalandhar Railway Station.

Air 

References 

Villages in Jalandhar district